Buckinghamshire Archives (prior to 2020 the Centre for Buckinghamshire Studies) is the county record office for Buckinghamshire, England. It houses the former Buckinghamshire Record Office and the former Buckinghamshire Local Studies Library.

The principal collections cover current-day Buckinghamshire (the areas administered by Buckinghamshire Council and Milton Keynes Council), as well as those areas of the county that are now in Berkshire, and include records from a range of organisations, families and individuals, notably:

 Church of England and Nonconformist churches including registers of baptism, marriage and burial
 Around 35,000 wills proved by the Archdeaconry of Buckingham
 County and District Councils
 Quarter and Petty Session courts
 Landed estates of families including the Aubrey-Fletchers, Hampdens, Carringtons and Fremantles
 Historic maps including Ordnance Survey, tithe and inclosure maps

The Archive also holds:

 A wide range of local history books, some for loan.
 Pamphlets and articles of local history interest.
 Local newspapers
 Computers for access to family history resources like Ancestry and FreeBMD.

Individual highlights within the collections include: the Winslow Manor court records and rolls, from 1327 onwards; records of the courts of the Archdeaconry of Buckingham, from 1483 onwards; the Charter to Incorporate the Borough of Buckingham by Letters Patent of Mary I, 1554; the cartulary of Missenden Abbey; the journal of Georgiana Grenfell of Taplow Court originally created for her children but by 1870 becoming her own personal journal, together with other papers of the Grenfell family; archives and records of Stoke Mandeville Hospital; papers and correspondence of the poet Theodora Roscoe; the 1798 posse comitatus of the Marquess of Buckingham as Lord Lieutenant of Buckinghamshire; and papers of Lord Carrington, including non-Carrington items such as the "Wycombe Family Notes", compiled by Charles W. Raffety.

The current County Archivist for Buckinghamshire Archives is Daniel Williams, since December 2020.

References

External links
Official site
Online catalogue

Archives in Buckinghamshire
Organisations based in Buckinghamshire
Aylesbury
Buckinghamshire